J. Hyatt Brown (born July 12, 1937) is an American billionaire businessman and politician in the state of Florida.

Brown was born in Orlando and grew up in Daytona Beach. He attended the University of Florida and works in the insurance industry.

Brown sat in the Florida House of Representatives for the 31st district, as a Democrat, from 1972 to 1980. From 1978 to 1980, he was Speaker of the Florida House of Representatives.

In 2009, Brown retired as CEO of his insurance agency, Brown & Brown. In March 2018, he was worth an estimated $1.1 billion. In 2012, Brown and his wife Cici donated $13 million to the Museum of Arts and Sciences in Daytona Beach for the construction of the Brown Museum, which opened in early 2015. In 2018, Brown and his wife donated $18 million to Stetson University and pledged $15 million to improve Daytona Beach’s Riverfront Park.

References

Living people
1937 births
People from Orlando, Florida
People from Daytona Beach, Florida
People from Ormond Beach, Florida
Members of the Florida House of Representatives
American billionaires